The ragwort leafminer, Chromatomyia syngenesiae, also known by the synonym Phytomyza syngenesiae, is a Palaearctic fly, also present in Australia and New Zealand, with larvae that make leaf mines in Senecio species and other related herbaceous daisies.

References

Agromyzidae
Diptera of Europe
Insects described in 1849